Jean-Michel Duroy (16 December 1753, Bernay, Eure–16 June 1795, Paris) was a French revolutionary.

He was a member of the national convention, backed the Mountain, and voted for the execution of the king.  He took part in the suppression of a revolt in Normandy.

He supported the Revolt of 1 Prairial Year III (20 May 1795), for which he was tried and executed by guillotine.

References

« Jean-Michel Duroy », in Adolphe Robert and Gaston Cougny, Dictionnaire des parlementaires français, Edgar Bourloton, 1889-1891

Regicides of Louis XVI
1753 births
1795 deaths
French people executed by guillotine during the French Revolution
People from Eure
Executed revolutionaries
Montagnards